High Throughput File System (HTFS) is the journaling file system used by current versions of
SCO OpenServer. It is the successor of EAFS.

Disk file systems